Qeyqaj (also Romanized as Qeyqāj; also known as Qīqāch) is a village in Zangebar Rural District, in the Central District of Poldasht County, West Azerbaijan Province, Iran. At the 2006 census, its population was 117, in 27 families.

References 

Populated places in Poldasht County